Alteripontixanthobacter maritimus is a Gram-negative and rod-shaped bacterium from the genus of Alteripontixanthobacter which has been isolated from seawater from the Yellow Sea.

References

Sphingomonadales
Bacteria described in 2019